Sophie Isaacs (born 20 September 1988) is an English stage actress and singer. She is known for portraying the role of Heather McNamara in Heathers: The Musical at The Other Palace and Theatre Royal Haymarket and for portraying Katherine Howard in Six at the Arts Theatre, Lyric Theatre and Vaudeville Theatre.

Career 
Isaacs started out her professional acting career after graduating from the London School of Musical Theatre (located in Elephant & Castle) in 2009 and preceded to star in both Hope at the Bridewell Theatre and Zombie Prom at the Landor Theatre, before starring in British soap opera Hollyoaks as character 'Molly Montgomery' in 2010. She then went on to star in the UK touring production of Legally Blonde: The Musical in 2011, portraying 'Margot' and understudying the principal role of Elle Woods and in 2014, she portrayed the role of Amber Von Tussle in a production of musical Hairspray in Singapore and Kuala Lumpur. Isaacs then starred in the West End productions of both Made in Dagenham in 2014, and Kinky Boots in 2015-2016, both at the Adephi Theatre, as well as then portrayed the role of 'Janet Weiss' in the European touring production of The Rocky Horror Show. Isaacs then went on to play the role of Heather McNamara in the original West End production of Heathers: The Musical at The Other Palace and Theatre Royal Haymarket,  before portraying 'Goldilocks' in the pantomime Goldilocks & The Three Bears at the London Palladium. Isaacs currently appears in the West End production of Six alongside principal cast members Jarnéia Richard-Noel, Courtney Bowman, Natalie Paris, Alexia McIntosh and Danielle Steers. Six was one of the first musical to return to the West End after the COVID-19 pandemic. From late September 2021, Isaacs is then due (along with the rest of the production of Six) to move to the nearby Vaudeville Theatre. She also starred in a principal role in Pantoland at The Palladium at the afore mentioned London Palladium from December 2021 to January 2022.

Theatre Credits

Filmography

Television

Radio

References 

1988 births
Living people
21st-century English actresses
Actresses from Gloucestershire
English stage actresses
21st-century English women singers
21st-century English singers
English musical theatre actresses
Musicians from Gloucestershire
People from Cheltenham